Ernest Anthony Puente Jr. (April 20, 1923 – June 1, 2000), commonly known as Tito Puente, was an American musician, songwriter, bandleader, and record producer of Puerto Rican descent. He is best known for dance-oriented mambo and Latin jazz compositions from his 50-year career. His most famous song is "Oye Como Va".

Puente and his music have appeared in films including The Mambo Kings and Fernando Trueba's Calle 54. He guest-starred on television shows, including Sesame Street and The Simpsons two-part episode "Who Shot Mr. Burns?".

Early life
Tito Puente was born on April 20, 1923, at Harlem Hospital Center in the New York borough of Manhattan, the son of Ernest and Felicia Puente, Puerto Ricans living in New York City's Spanish Harlem. His family moved frequently, but he spent the majority of his childhood in Spanish Harlem. Puente's father was the foreman at a razorblade factory. 

As a child, he was described as hyperactive, and after neighbors complained of hearing seven-year-old Puente beating on pots and window frames, his mother sent him to 25-cent piano lessons. He switched to percussion by the age of 10, drawing influence from jazz drummer Gene Krupa. He later created a song-and-dance duo with his sister Anna in the 1930s and intended to become a dancer, but an ankle tendon injury prevented him from pursuing dance as a career. When the drummer in Machito's band was drafted to the army, Puente subsequently took his place.

Career

Puente served in the Navy for three years during World War II after being drafted in 1942. He was discharged with a Presidential Unit Citation for serving in nine battles on the escort carrier USS Santee (CVE-29). The GI Bill allowed him to study music at Juilliard School of Music, where he completed formal education in conducting, orchestration, and theory.

During the 1950s, Puente was at the height of his popularity and helped to bring Afro-Cuban and Caribbean sounds like mambo, son, and cha-cha-chá, to mainstream audiences. Puente played popular Afro-Cuban rhythms so successfully that many people mistakenly identified him as Cuban. Dance Mania, possibly Puente's most well-known album, was released in 1958.

Among his most famous compositions is the cha-cha "Oye como va" (1963), popularized by Latin rock musician Carlos Santana and later interpreted, among others, by Julio Iglesias, Irakere and Celia Cruz. In 1969, he received the key to the City of New York from former Mayor John Lindsay. In 1992, he was inducted into the National Congressional Record, and in 1993 he received the James Smithson Bicentennial Medal from the Smithsonian.

In early 2000, Puente appeared in the music documentary Calle 54. 

Tito Puente's name is often mentioned in a television production called La Epoca, a film about the Palladium era in New York, Afro-Cuban music and rhythms, mambo and salsa as dances and music and much more. The film discusses many of Puente's, as well as Arsenio Rodríguez's, contributions and features interviews with some of the musicians Puente recorded with.

Personal life and death
Puente's son Richard "Richie" Puente was the percussionist in the 1970s funk band Foxy. Puente's youngest son, Tito Puente Jr., has continued his father's legacy by presenting many of the same songs in his performances and recordings. His daughter Audrey Puente is a television meteorologist for WNYW and WWOR-TV in New York City.

After a show in Puerto Rico on May 31, 2000, he suffered a massive heart attack and was flown to New York City for surgery to repair a heart valve, but complications developed, and he died on June 1, 2000, at 2:27 am. He was posthumously awarded the Grammy Lifetime Achievement Award in 2003.

Awards and recognition

In 1995, Tito Puente received the Billboard Latin Music Lifetime Achievement Award.
During the presidency of Sen. Roberto Rexach Benítez, Tito Puente received the unique honor of having both a special session of the Senate of Puerto Rico dedicated to him and being allowed to perform in his unique style on the floor of the Senate while it was in session.
On September 10, 2007, a United States Post Office in Spanish Harlem was named after him at a ceremony presided over by House Ways and Means Committee Chair Charles Rangel (D-NY) and Rep. José Serrano (D-NY).
An amphitheater was named in his honor at Luis Muñoz Marín Park, next to the Roberto Clemente Coliseum, in San Juan, Puerto Rico.
 In 1995, Puente was awarded an Honorary Doctorate of Music from Berklee College of Music.
Puente performed at the closing ceremonies at the 1996 Summer Olympics in Atlanta, Georgia. The timbales he used are displayed at the National Museum of American History in Washington, D.C.
In 1997, he was awarded the National Medal of Arts.
In 1990, he received a Star on the Hollywood Walk Of Fame.
In 1984, he received an honorary Decree from the Los Angeles City Council.
On June 5, 2005, Puente was honored by Union City, New Jersey with a star on the Walk of Fame at Union City's Celia Cruz Park.
In 1999, he was inducted into the International Latin Music Hall of Fame.
On May 19, 1999, he received an honorary Mus.D degree from Columbia University.
On August 20, 2000, East 110th Street in Spanish Harlem was named 'Tito Puente Way'. 
On October 11, 2022, Puente was honored with a Google Doodle in honor of Hispanic Heritage Month.

Discography

As leader

Mambos Vol. 1 & Vol. 2 (10" LP's, 1951) Tico
Mambos Vol. 3 & Vol. 4 (10" LP's, 1952) Tico
Mambos Vol. 5 & King of the Mambo, Vol. 6 (10" LP's, 1953) Tico
Mamborama (1955) Tico
Puente In Percussion (1956) Tico
Cha Cha Cha's For Lovers (1956) Tico
Cuban Carnival (1956) RCA Victor
Night Beat (1957) RCA Victor
Top Percussion (1958) RCA Victor
Dance Mania (1958) RCA Victor
Dancing Under Latin Skies (1959)
Mucho Cha-Cha (1959)
Tambo (1960) RCA Victor
Cha Cha With Tito Puente at Grossinger's (1960) RCA Victor
El Rey: Bravo (1962) Tico
Tito Puente Swings, The Exciting Lupe Sings (1965)
El Rey (The King) (1968) Tico
El Rey: Tito Puente & His Latin Ensemble (1984) Concord Picante
Mambo Diablo (1985) Concord Picante
Sensacion (1986) Concord Picante
Un Poco Loco (1987) Bellaphon
Goza Mi Timbal (1989) Concord Picante
Tito's Idea (1995) Tropi Jazz / RMM
Jazzin'  (with India) (1996) Tropi Jazz / RMM
Percussion's King (1997)
Selection of Mambo & Cha Cha Cha (1997)
50 Years of Swing (1997)
Tito Meets Machito: Mambo Kings (1997)
Cha Cha Cha Rumba Beguine (1998)
Dance Mania '99: Live at Birdland (1998)
The Very Best of Tito Puente (1998)
Timbalero Tropical (1998)
Yambeque (1998)
Absolute Best (1999)
Carnival (1999)
Colección original (1999)
Golden Latin Jazz All Stars: In Session (1999)
Latin Flight (1999)
Latin Kings (1999)
Lo mejor de lo mejor (1999)
Mambo Birdland (1999)
Special Delivery featuring Maynard Ferguson (1996)
Rey (2000)
His Vibes & Orchestra (2000)
Cha Cha Cha for Lovers (2000)
Homenaje a Beny Moré Vol. 3 (2000) featuring Celia Cruz
Dos ídolos. Su música (2000)
Tito Puente y su Orquesta Mambo (2000)
The Complete RCA Recordings. Vol. 1 (2000)
The Best of the Concord Years (2000)
Por fin (Finally) (2000)
Party with Puente! (2000)
Masterpiece/Obra maestra (2000) with Eddie Palmieri
Mambo Mambo (2000)
Mambo King Meets the Queen of Salsa (2000)
Latin Abstract (2000)
Kings of Mambo (2000)
Cha Cha Cha for Lovers (2000)
The Legends Collection: Tito Puente & Celia Cruz (2001)
The Complete RCA Recordings, Vol. 2 (2001)
RCA Recordings (2001)
Puente caliente (2001)
The Best of... (2001)
King of Mambo (2001)
El Rey: Pa'lante! Straight! (2001)
Cocktail Hour (2001)
Selection. King of Mambo (2001)
Herman Meets Puente (2001)
Undisputed (2001)
Fiesta (2002)
Colección Diamante (2002)
Tito Puente y Celia Cruz (2002)
Live at the Playboy Jazz Festival (2002)
King of Kings: The Very Best of Tito Puente (2002)
Hot Timbales! (2002)
Dr. Feelgood (2002)
Carnaval de éxitos (2002)
Caravan Mambo (2002)
We Love Salsa (2006)
Quatro: The Definitive Collection(2012)

As sideman
With Dizzy Gillespie
Rhythmstick (1990)
With Benny Golson
Remembering Clifford (Milestone, 1998)
With Quincy Jones
Quincy Plays for Pussycats (Mercury, 1959–65 [1965])
With Hilton Ruiz
Rhythm in the House (RMM, 1976 [1998])
With Sonny Stitt
The Matadors Meet the Bull (Roulette, 1965)

Filmography

Selected feature films
Armed and Dangerous (1986) as Band Leader
Radio Days (1987) as Latin Bandleader
The Mambo Kings (1992) as Himself

Documentaries
Tito Puente: The King of Latin Music (2000)
Profiles Featuring Tito Puente Jr. (2007)
Latin Knights (2005)
Calle 54 (2000)

Concert films
Tito Puente – Live in Montreal (Montreal Jazz Festival) (1983) (2003)

The Simpsons
Puente appeared in the two-part whodunit drama "Who Shot Mr. Burns?" in the sixth season finale and seventh season premiere of American comedy cartoon show The Simpsons in 1995. In the shows, Puente joins Springfield Elementary School as a music teacher after the school discovers it is located over an oil well. However, Mr. Burns manages to pump the oil first, which makes him the legal owner of the well. This causes the school to fall into debt with budget cuts to the music and maintenance departments, causing Puente to lose his job. When Burns is later shot, Puente becomes one of the prime suspects but manages to clear himself by performing one of his songs for Chief Wiggum. Seven alternative endings were filmed of various characters shooting Burns; Puente is one of the alternates. Although all endings were animated, the ending of Maggie Simpson shooting Burns was the ending chosen to air.

The Emmy-nominated song "Señor Burns" from the episode is featured on the 1999 album Go Simpsonic with The Simpsons.

Associated acts
Eddie Torres (born July 3, 1950), also known as "The Mambo King", is a salsa dance instructor and choreographer. Torres is most known for his association with Puente. Torres' technique developed from various sources including Afro-Cuban son, mambo, and North American jazz dance.  His dancing is characterized by sharp, clean movements and a strong connection to the rhythm of the music.

References

Further reading
Steven Loza (1999) Tito Puente and the Making of Latin Music, University of Illinois Press
Josephine Powell  (2007) "Tito Puente: When The Drums Are Dreaming", (Authorhouse 2007)

External links

Tito Puente at NPR Music

Tito Puente Interview NAMM Oral History Library (1997)

Afro-Cuban jazz percussionists
American jazz bandleaders
American jazz drummers
American jazz vibraphonists
American male drummers
American musicians of Puerto Rican descent
American salsa musicians
The Blackout All-Stars members
Fania Records artists
Grammy Lifetime Achievement Award winners
Jazz musicians from New York (state)
Jazz fusion musicians
Avant-garde jazz musicians
Juilliard School alumni
Latin Grammy Award winners
Latin jazz drummers
Latin music composers
Puerto Rican composers
Big band bandleaders
Latin jazz bandleaders
Latin jazz composers
American male jazz musicians
Mambo musicians
Musicians from New York City
1923 births
People from East Harlem
RCA Victor artists
RMM Records artists
Salsa
Tico Records artists
Timbaleros
20th-century American drummers
20th-century American male musicians
2000 deaths
United States Navy personnel of World War II
United States National Medal of Arts recipients
United States Navy sailors
Puerto Rican military officers